Šempeter may refer to several places in Slovenia: 

Olešče, a settlement in the Municipality of Laško (formerly and locally known as Šempeter)
Otočec, a settlement in the Municipality of Novo Mesto (formerly and locally known as Šempeter)
Pivka, a settlement in the Municipality of Pivka (formerly and locally known as Šempeter)
Šempeter, Ljubljana, a neighborhood in Ljubljana
Šempeter pri Gorici, a settlement in the Municipality of Šempeter–Vrtojba
Šempeter v Savinjski Dolini, a settlement in the Municipality of Žalec